Zygaena sogdiana is a species of moth in the Zygaenidae family. It is found in Central Asia.

References

External links
Images representing Zygaena sogdiana at Bold

Moths described in 1874
Zygaena
Moths of Asia